Great Britain, represented by the British Olympic Association (BOA), competed as the host nation for the 1948 Summer Olympics in London. It was the second time that the United Kingdom had hosted the Summer Olympic Games, equalling the record of France and the United States to that point.  British athletes have competed in every Summer Olympic Games. 404 competitors, 335 men and 68 women, took part in 139 events in 21 sports.

Medallists

|style="text-align:left;width:78%;vertical-align:top"|

|style="text-align:left;width:22%;vertical-align:top"|

Athletics

Track & road events

Men

Women

Field events
Men

Women

Basketball

Team roster

Preliminary Round (Group A)
 Lost to Uruguay (17-69)
 Lost to Canada (24-44)
 Lost to Brazil (11-67)
 Lost to Italy (28-49)
 Lost to Hungary (23-60)
Classification Matches
 17th/23rd place: Defeated Ireland (46-21)
 17th/20th place: Lost to China (25-54)
 19th/20th place: Lost to Egypt (18-50) → 20th place

Boxing

Canoeing

Cycling

Ten cyclists, all men, represented Great Britain in 1948.

Road

Track

Time trial

Sprint, tandem and pursuit

Diving

Men

Women

Equestrian

Eventing

Jumping

Fencing

19 fencers, 16 men and 3 women, represented Great Britain in 1948.

Men

Women

Football

Summary

Gymnastics

The British Gymnastics team competed in nine events and was made up of 16 gymnasts, (8 men and 8 women),  
including Frank Turner and George Weedon.

Hockey

Summary

Team roster

Group stage

Semifinals

Gold medal match

Lacrosse

Modern pentathlon

Three male pentathletes represented Great Britain in 1948.

Rowing

Great Britain had 26 male rowers participate in all seven rowing events in 1948.

Sailing

Shooting

Twelve shooters represented Great Britain in 1948.

Swimming

Men

Women

Water polo

Summary

Weightlifting

Wrestling

At the end of the match, all wrestlers were given "bad points", according to the results of their bouts. The loser received 3 points if the loss was by fall or unanimous decision and 2 points if the decision was 2–1. The winner received 1 point if the win was by decision and 0 points if the win was by fall. At the end of each round, any wrestler with at least 5 points was eliminated.

Art competitions

85 art competitors, 65 men and 20 women, represented Great Britain in 1948.

Mixed Architecture, Architectural Designs
 Patrick Horsbrugh

References

Nations at the 1948 Summer Olympics
1948
Olympics